E100 or E-100 may refer to:

Electronics
 Casio Cassiopeia E-100, a pocket of knife PC
 iriver E100, a portable media player

Vehicles

Automobiles
 Baojun E100, a Chinese electric microcar
 JMEV E100, a Chinese electric city car
 Toyota Corolla (E100), a Japanese compact car lineup

Military vehicles
 Panzerkampfwagen E-100, a proposed German World War II super-heavy tank

Other uses
 Curcumin, food coloring from turmeric designated by E number E100
 Neat ethanol fuel, or E100, a fuel blend with almost 100% ethanol